Ilaria Sciorelli (born 19 February 1974) is an Italian swimmer. She competed in two events at the 1992 Summer Olympics.

References

1974 births
Living people
Italian female swimmers
Olympic swimmers of Italy
Swimmers at the 1992 Summer Olympics
Sportspeople from Turin